Florence O'Donoghue (22 July 1894–18 December 1967) was an Irish historian and head of intelligence of the Cork No. 1 Brigade of the Irish Republican Army during the Irish War of Independence.

He was born in Rathmore, County Kerry, Ireland in on 22 July 1894, the son of farmer Patrick O'Donoghue and Margaret Cronin. He moved to Cork in 1910, where he worked as an apprentice in the drapery trade.

Military life 

The 1916 Easter Rising was a watershed in O'Donoghue's life. In December 1916, Florence joined the Cork branch of the Irish Volunteers. In early 1917, he was elected unanimously 1st Lieutenant of the Cyclist Company and as result devoted all his spare time to Volunteer work. He began writing weekly for two years for the Irish World newspaper. By May 1917, he was sworn into the Irish Republican Brotherhood and in October, Tomás Mac Curtain appointed O'Donoghue as communications of the Cork Brigade. He replaced Pat Higgins as Brigade Adjutant in February 1917. O'Donoghue was a key organiser in the sensational jail-break of Captain Donnchadh Mac Niallghuis on Armistice Day 1918 and took personal responsibility for his protection. Michael Collins was the last officer from Volunteers General Headquarters to visit Cork shortly after Christmas 1919, until the truce in 1921.

O'Donoghue built up an intelligence network and agents which included his future wife, Josephine Marchment. She was head female clerk at the 6th Division Headquarters at Victoria Barracks, Cork and passed on secret British Army correspondence to him. Florence recruited people to open letters, tap phone lines and intercept telegrams. The Irish Republican Army had 2,000 active members in Cork which were also used for intelligence gathering. By March 1920, after killing a RIC Inspector, Florence was on the run and serving full-time in the Irish Republican Army. In November that year, the Cork Brigade killed six British Army Officers and executed five Cork civilians on suspicion of spying.

After two and a half years of fighting, a truce was agreed on 11 July 1921. When the Dáil approved the Anglo-Irish Treaty, in January 1922, the IRA split into pro- and anti-treaty camps. Over the coming months and after being elected onto the army’s executive as Adjutant-General, O'Donoghue warned of the dangers of an Irish Civil War. In June 1922, he resigned from the army's national executive and a month later, on 3 July 1922, from the army. Civil war did break out on 28 June 1922 between pro and anti treaty factions, much to O'Donoghue's dismay.

During the civil war, he remained neutral and tried to organise a truce to end the fighting. In December 1922, he formed a group called the "Neutral IRA", along with Sean O'Hegarty, composed of pro-truce IRA men. O'Donoghue claimed he had 20,000 members in this group. He campaigned for a month's truce between the two sides, so that a political compromise could be reached. However, his efforts came to nothing and in March 1923, he wound up the "Neutral IRA", judging that its objectives could not be achieved. The civil war ended on 24 May 1923.

He served as major in the Irish Army from 1939-1946. He formed a Supplementary Intelligence Service that would remain behind enemy lines in the event of an invasion. He also taught guerrilla war tactics to new army recruits.

Home life 

Florence married Josephine Brown, née Marchment in April 1921 and had four children. The couple also adopted two children from Josephine’s first marriage, including Reggie Brown, whom Florence kidnapped from his grandparents in Wales in 1920. Florence became a rate collector and remained outside politics.

In later years he became a respected historian. While in the army he edited An Cosantóir, the Irish Army’s magazine. He convinced Éamon de Valera to establish the Bureau of Military History which would record personal accounts from the Irish War of Independence. O'Donoghue was a recording officer until 1948. His most famous work is his biography on Liam Lynch, entitled No Other Law.

O'Donoghue died on 18 December 1967 and Tom Barry gave the graveside oration.

Notes

People of the Irish Civil War
1890s births
1967 deaths
20th-century Irish historians
Irish Republican Army (1919–1922) members
Irish Army officers
Members of the Irish Republican Brotherhood
People from County Kerry
National Army (Ireland) officers
People of the Irish War of Independence